Bill G.B. Pallot (born 17 February 1964) is an art historian, art expert, collector and lecturer at the Sorbonne University (Paris IV).
He was honored with the French distinction of Ordre des Arts et des Lettres Chevalier (1997) and he is now Officier in the same distinction (2011). In 2016, he was indicted for making and selling false eighteenth century furniture, some of which were sold to the Palace of Versailles.

Life and career
He is the son of Maurice-Claude Pallot, an antiques dealer in Burgundy, France. Bill Pallot first studied classics and history of art at the University of Lyon, France. He then continued his studies in history of art at the Sorbonne in Paris until he obtained his Diplome des Hautes études Approfondies en Histoire de L'art (D.E.A., 1986). The subject of his thesis entitled "Les Tilliard et les Foliot, menuisiers en siéges aux XVIIéme et XVIIIéme siècles".

For over 20 years, he has been in charge of the department of furniture and objets d'art at the Didier Aaron Gallery in Paris. Advising major art collectors, he loves to transmit his passion for the 18th century not only to his private clients, but also to his students at the Sorbonne where he has been teaching for more than fifteen years.

He is a member of the Syndicat National des Antiquaires (Paris), a member of the Syndicat Français des Experts Professionnels (Paris) and a member of the Compagnie des Experts, the grouping of sworn experts before the Court of Appeal of Paris. He is a sworn expert in good standing before the Court of Appeal of Paris as well as before the French Customs authorities. Beyond this, he has donated to the Département des Objets d'Art of the Louvre Museum an armchair, c. 1770–75, by N.Q. Foliot (1996, Inv OA 11813) and a chair, c. 1785, by IB Boulard (2004, Inv. OA 12134). Under his patronage, a suite of 4 Louis XVI folding stools (2001, Inv. 1972) belonging to the Jacquemart-Andre Museum was restored.

As a member of the Cressent Club (President : Maryvonne Pinault), he was also a sponsor of the restoration of the Department of Objets d'Art at the Louvre Museum.

Practical work
The contribution of Bill Pallot to the history of furniture is far reaching and measured by the publication of the history of chairs from 1700 to the start of the Louis XVI style (in "Bill Pallot, Antiquaire" by Roxana Azimi, Journal des Arts, April 2011). Having written his first book at the age of 22, "L'art du siège au XVIIIème siècle en France", published in 1987, ACR-Gismondi editions, then " The Furniture of the Louvre- chairs and consoles of the 17th and 18th Century", published in 1993 by Faton editions, he is considered as one of the most distinguished experts on chairs of the Age of Enlightenment.
 
On the watch for artistique phenomenon of our time and curious about the history of all civilisations, Bill Pallot intends nevertheless to uphold the banner for 18th-century French art.

Also he was a member of the Scientific committee for the major exhibition "18° siècle. Aux sources du Design.Chefs-d'œuvre du mobilier 1650–1790" ("18th Century. Birth of Design. Furniture Masterpieces 1650–1790" ) at the Palace of Versailles from 28 October 2014 to 22 February 2015, he was one of the contributors to the catalogue of the exhibition.

Bibliography

Publications 
 « 1772 : Fournisseurs et clients de Nicolas Heurtaut à l'époque néo-classique » in L'Estampille, mars 1985, p. 52-59.
 « Ecran de feu rocaille » in " L'Estampille ", septembre 1985, pp. 65–66.
 « Nicolas Heurtaut, menuisier et sculpteur en sièges », mémoire de maîtrise en Sorbonne, 1985.
 « Secrétaire de Canabas » in " L'Estampille ", février 1986, pp 59–60 (sous le pseudonyme Boris Guichené).
 « Les Tilliard et les Foliot, menuisiers en sièges », mémoire de DEA en Sorbonne, 1986.
 « Les meubles peints sur fond d'érable-sycomore », in " Connaissance des Arts ", février 1987, p. 98-108.
 « Pour un Versailles italien » in " Connaissance des Arts ", juin 1987, p. 62-64.
 « Contant, Foliot et le palais Bernstorff » in « Chevotet Contant, Chaussard : un cabinet d'architecte au siècle des lumières », Paris, 1987, p. 105-107.
 « L'Art du siège au XVIIIe siècle en France (1720–1775) », Paris, 1987, éditions ACR-Gismondi.
 « Les commodités de la conversation » in " L'Objet d'Art ", novembre 1987, p. 52-62.
 « L'art du siège selon Nicolas Heurtaut » in Connaissance des arts, octobre 1987, p. 102-110.
 « Le salon du baron Bernstorff par N.Q Foliot » in " L'Estampille ", décembre 1987, p. 22-28.
 « Le syndrome du siège » in Drouot 1986 - 1987, 1987, p. 200-202.
 « De l'élaboration d'un siège au XVIIIe siècle » in " Catalogue Salon d'Antibes ", avril 1988.
 « 1793 : pour une poignée de livres » in " Demeures et Châteaux ", juillet 1989, p. 29-32.
 « The art of chair in eighteenth century France », Paris, 1989, éditions ACR-Gismondi.
 « 1700–1880, Meubles et objets d'art » catalogues de la galerie Didier Aaron, Paris, de 1990 à 2010 (publications éditées, à l'occasion des Biennales des Antiquaires, à Paris)
 « Tous les chemins mènent à Bruxelles » in " Connaissance des Arts ", février 1991, p52 - 59.
 « Dessins à desseins » in " Connaissance des Arts ", avril 1992, p. 60-67.
 « Mourir assis" Editorial de l'exposition « Sièges sous influences », Louvre des Antiquaires, mai - août 1991.
 « Les sièges turcs du comte d'Artois » in L'Estampille - L'Objet d'art, juillet 1991, p. 46-51.
 « Carlton House ou le goût du prince » in " Connaissance des Arts", octobre 1991,p. 110 - 117.
 « De quelques vérités sur le mobilier miniature », Préface de l'exposition « Meubles miniatures et modèles », galerie Laloux - David, Bruxelles, décembre 1991.
 « L'évolution de la commode » in  " Connaissance des Arts ", numéro spécial, septembre 1992, p. 29 - 35.
 « Les quatre fauteuils de Madame Infante » in catalogue Biennale des Antiquaires, septembre 1992, p. 26-39.
 « Le comte d'Artois » in Connaissance des arts, numéro spécial sur Bagatelle, 1993, p. 8-21.
 « Le mobilier du musée du Louvre - Sièges et consoles XVIIème et XVIIIème siècles», Dijon, 1993, éditions Faton.
 « Les sièges du château de Saint-Cloud » in " L'Estampille - L'Objet d'art ", octobre 1993, p. 34 - 47.
 « Louvre chairs » in " Antique ", décembre 1993, pp. 602 – 603.
 « Un siège à succès de Nicolas Heurtaut » in L'Estampille - L'Objet d'art, octobre 1994, p. 38-47.
 « Foliot et les sièges du baron Bernstorff » in catalogue Biennale des Antiquaires, novembre 1994, p. 122-131.
 « Le mobilier du musée du Louvre - sièges XVIIème et XVIIIème siècles »," L'Estampille-L'Objet d'art ", Hors série (n°10 H), 1994. Version simplifiée de l'ouvrage de 1993.
 « Le lit d'Effiat, rare témoignage du lit à la française au XVIIème siècle » et « Les différents types de lits et les créations des ornemanistes », in " Dossier de l'Art " n°22, février - mars 1995, p. 16 - 21.
 « Sur les traces du 4ème fauteuil de la duchesse de Parme » in L'Estampille - L'Objet d'art, mai 1995, p. 58-66
 « Les sièges à l'Antique de la marquise de Marbeuf » in L'Estampille - L'Objet d'art, octobre 1996, p. 44-53
 « Le XVIIIème siècle en état de sièges » in " Maison Française ", décembre 1996, p. 174-177.
 « B.V.R.B., une histoire d'encoignures et de laque du Japon » in " Connaissance des Arts ", octobre 1997, p. 60 - 65
 « Hache.Une dynastie de menuisiers-ébénistes à Grenoble » in " Connaissance des Arts ", décembre 1997, p. 82-88.
 « Menuisiers au XVIIIème siècle  » in Le Sentier Bonne-Nouvelle,Action Artistique de la Ville de Paris 1999, p. 110-114.
 « Les sièges de la collection Karl Lagerfeld » in L'Estampille - L'Objet d'art, avril 2000, p. 42-57.
 « La duchesse d'Enville et les péripéties de La Roche Guyon » in " L'Estampille-L'Objet d'art ", juin 2001, p 50-59.
 « 1768 : Nicolas Heurtaut et la duchesse d'Enville » in Le retour d'Esther. Les fastes retrouvés du château de La Roche Guyon, château de La Roche-Guyon, 2001.
 « Le menuisier Nicolas Heurtaut chez le prince de Conti et le comte d'Artois » in " L'Estampille-L'Objet d'art ", Juillet 2002, p 68-74.
 « Deux chaises attribuées à Séné conservées au Louvre et au musée Jacquemart-André » in " La Revue des Musées de France - Revue du Louvre ", avril 2004, p. 218-227.
 « 1730.Dix fauteuils en Savonnerie jaune du château de La Roche Guyon » in " Objets d'art. Mélanges en l'honneur de Daniel Alcouffe ", Dijon, 2004, p. 78-80.
 « Les sièges Louis XV », en collaboration, in " France Antiquités " Hors série, novembre 2004, p. 4-10/58-60/64-65/70-73.
 « Le mobilier français du musée Jacquemart-André », co-écrit avec N. Sainte Fare Garnot, Dijon, 2006.
 « Le mobilier retrouvé du musée Jacquemart-André », co-écrit avec N. Sainte Fare Garnot, in " L'Estampille-L'Objet d'art ", mars 2006, p. 38-49.
 « Louis XVI ressuscité en son château, in " Le Journal des arts ",janvier 2007, N°250, p.8.
 « Marqueteries en cloisonné de la veuve Duvinage » in " L'Estampille-L'Objet d'art ", septembre 2007, p.72-82.
 « Avatars, the 18th century origins of Design », juin 2010, catalogue et commissariat de l'exposition « Avatars »,  Foire de Design de Bâle (Design Miami/Basel)
 « 18th Century. Birth of Design.Furniture Masterpieces 1650–1790 », Versailles, musée du château de Versailles, 2014/15, catalogue de l'exposition, ouvrage collectif, Dijon, 2014, pp.62-63,84-89,98-99,100-101, 116, 118-119, 120-133, 184-187, 206-207, 224-229, 232-233,263-267.

Forthcoming 
 « L'art du siège au XVIIIème siècle en France (1770–1800) », tome II, Paris.

Articles 

 « Bill G.B. Pallot, Un expert expertisé », par Laure Verchère, in Elle Décoration, octobre, 1994, p. 50.
 « Jeunes antiquaires à Paris, Bill G.B. Pallot », par Jeanne Faton, in L'Estampille - L'Objet d'art, janvier 1995, p. 57.
 « Bill G.B. Pallot : Le jeune homme pressé », par Céline Lefranc, in Connaissance des arts, juin 1996, p.72-73.
 « Bill G.B. Pallot. Il aura sa galerie ! », par Françoise de Perthuis, in Beaux Arts Magazine, numéro spécial ; septembre 1996, p.15.
 « Hippie von heute. Bill G.B. Pallot », par Ursula Harbrecht, in Architektur und Wohnen,  novembre 1996, p.62-66, p.224.
 « Leurs cadeaux de Noël. Bill G.B. Pallot, antiquaire » par Aude de la Conté, in " Beaux-Arts magazine ", décembre 1997, p.109
 « Chevalier des Arts et des Lettres, Bill G.B. Pallot, un jeune antiquaire, parle de son métier » par Louis Faton in L'Estampille - L'Objet d'art, janvier 1998, p.12.
 « Objet-passion. Bill GB Pallot et son armure » par Franck Maubert in Elle Décoration, novembre 1999, p.108.
 « Le double Je de Bill G.B Pallot » par Sylvie Santini in " Maison Française ", juin 2000, p43-44.
 « Bill Pallot, portrait en pied du « Père Lachaise » » par Patrick Lefur in " Gazette de l'Hôtel Drouot/E dans l'A ", février 2001, p40-42
 « In Kabinett des Dr. Pallot » par Ian Phillips, in " AD. Architectural Digest ", décembre-janvier 2001–2002, p135-145.
 « Bill Pallot. La chambre aux trésors » par Ian Phillips, in " AD. Architectural Digest Russie ", octobre 2002, p172-179.
 « Le roi Bill chez lui : fastueux et impertinent » par Marie-Claire Blanckaert in " Elle Décoration ", décembre 2002, p206-211.
 « Chez Bill Pallot : Quand l'art contemporain rencontre le grand genre » in « Le Paris de Elle Déco », Paris 2003, p226-229.
 « Bill Pallot : Les plaisanteries d'un antiquaire » par Souria Sadekova in " Interior Design Magazine. Russie ", décembre 2003, p100-106.
 « Bill Pallot : L'or d'un bourgeois » par Souria Sadekova in " Interior Design Magazine. Russie " janvier 2004, p70-79.
 « Chez Bill Pallot : La Garçonnière d'un dandy » par Anne Rogier, in " Point de Vue ", janvier 2004, p56-61.
 « Vivre avec Bill » par Souria Sadekova in « 100% salles de bains » supplément de " Interior Design Magazine. Russie " février 2004, p146-149.
 « Bill Pallot » par Souria Sadekova in « Antiquaire » supplément de "Interior Design Magazine. Russie " septembre 2004, p66-67.
 « Trois questions à Bill GB Pallot » par Armelle Malvoisin in " Le Journal des arts ", septembre 2005, N°221, p. 21.
 « Le monde selon Bill » par Françoise-Claire Prodhon in AD Architectural Digest, décembre 2005, p. 162-167.
 « Quand les faux ne font pas défaut. Bill Pallot, sièges et pièges » par Anne Rogier et Philippe Séguy in " Point de Vue ", janvier 2006, N°2999, p. 56-57.
 « Bill Pallot. L'œil et l'esprit du père Lachaise» par Marie Maertens, in L'Œil, octobre 2006, p. 12.
 « Décor à habiter » par Sylvia Criara in La Mia Casa (Italie), décembre-janvier 2007
 « Le refuge baroque d'un collectionneur excentrique » par Antonio Nieto in Gala, avril 2007, n°723, p. 80-84.
 « Cabinet de curiosités » par Philippe Seulliet in Les Plus Beaux Intérieurs, septembre-novembre 2007, p. 190-207.
 « Eclectica » par Antonio Nieto in Antiquariato, février 2008, p. 114-119.
 « Bill Pallot : accumulateur d'excentricité » par Isabelle de Wavrin in Beaux Arts Magazine, avril 2008, p. 72-77.
 « Bill Pallot : Sous le charme de l'éclat dansant » par Antonio Nieto in Le Temps, HS., Genève, 3 décembre 2008, p. 50-52.
 « Antiquaire et historien d'art, Bill Pallot tente de raviver l'image du XVIIIe siècle » par Roxana Azimi,in Le Journal des arts,  29 avril 2011,N°346,p. 34
 « Rencontre:Bill Pallot, esthète balzacien », par Anne Foster in Gazette de l'Hôtel Drouot, 12 avril 2013, n°14, p256-261
 « Bill Pallot, le chasseur de têtes » par Bertrand de Saint Vincent in « Le Figaro », 23 décembre 2013,n°21581,p. 27-28
 « Le cabinet des merveilles de Bill Pallot », par Bérénice Geoffroy-Schneiter in L'Estampille - L'Objet d'art ,septembre, 2014, p. 96-100
 « Bill Pallot », par Ellen Latil in La Riviera russe (en russe), décembre/janvier 2014,p. 38-45
 « Le XVIII° fut-il précurseur du design? Bill Pallot/Didier >Krzentowski, regards croisés » in La Gazette Drouot, 23/1/2015, p. 122-125
 « Bill Pallot. La connaissance de l'objet et l'amour de la collection » par Davina Macario in « L'Eventail », décembre 2015, p. 121-128
 « Bill Pallot: Wer wohnt denn da ? » par Meike Winnemuth in « Architektur & Wohnen », février-mars 2016, p. 68-72

TV shows 

 « Bill G.B. Pallot, acheteur à l'hôtel des ventes de Drouot » in « Drouot, la fièvre des enchères ». Magazine La Vie à l'endroit réalisé et présenté par Mireille Dumas, France 2, le 3/06/98, 22h45.
 « Bill G.B. Pallot, expert en objet d'art près les Douanes françaises» in « La France à vendre ? ». Magazine Capital réalisé et présenté par Emmanuel Chain, M6, le 4/04/1999,20h50.
 « Bill G.B. Pallot, un élégant expert d'art » in magazine " Zone Interdite " présenté par B.de La Villardière, M6, le 4/06/2000,20h50.
 « L'intérieur d'un expert d'art : Bill Pallot » in magazine Question maison présenté par Francis Blaise, France 5, le 08/03/2003 (1 partie), et le 15/03/03 (2 partie), 10h05.
 « Le bois sculpté » in série Le Génie français présentée par Catherine Deneuve, France 5, le 22/12/2003, 10h30.
 « Bill Pallot et le luxe » in Nec + Ultra présentée par Marie-Ange Horlaville, TV5 Monde, le 19/09/2004, 20h05.
 « Les faux dans l'art » in " C'est au programme " présentée par Sophie Davant, France 2, le 07/02/06, 9h30.
 « La Folie des enchères » documentaire réalisé par Corinne Savoyen, France 5, le 10/05/2009, 20h35.
 « L'oeil de Jimmy: l'Hôtel des ventes de Drouot », présenté par Flavie Flament, TV Jimmy, le 26 septembre 2011, 20h40
 « La Galerie France 5: Enquête d'art, le Cabinet Fontange par Pierre Gole. c.1680 », présenté par Laurence Piquet, France 5, 24 mars 2013, 8h45
 « Collections: Bill Pallot en son appartement », in Télématin, présenté par Mélanie Griffon, France 2, 2 janvier 2015, 8H10/ 9H25

References

 https://www.youtube.com/watch?v=8UuVRf4WIpY
 http://www.lejournaldesarts.fr/jda/archives/docs_article/84128/bill-pallot---antiquaire.php
 http://www.lexpress.fr/infos/pers/bill-pallot.html

1964 births
Living people
French art historians
French male non-fiction writers